Ozyptila bejarana is a species of crab spiders found in Spain and France.

References

External links 

bejarana
Spiders of Europe
Spiders described in 1998